Ali Kola-ye Ahi (also Romanized as ‘Alī Kolā-ye Āhī and ‘Ālī Kolā-ye Āhī) is a village in Harazpey-ye Jonubi Rural District, in the Central District of Amol County, Mazandaran Province, Iran. At the 2006 census, its population was 611, in 166 families.

References 

Populated places in Amol County